The Fabulous Filipino Brothers is a Philippine–American 2021 comedy drama film directed by Dante Basco produced under Cignal Entertainment and TheMachine. The film features the story of four brothers coming from a Filipino American family based in Pittsburg, California.

Cast

Main
Derek Basco as Darius "Dayo" Abasta
Dante Basco as Douglas "Duke" Abasta
Dionysio Basco as David Abasta
Darion Basco as Dante "Danny Boy" Abasta

Supporting
Joey Guila as Berto
Joseph Jitsukawa as Nicky Chang
Iluminada Monroy as Grandma Abasta
Solenn Heussaff as Anna
Tirso Cruz III
Crystal Kwon
Liza Lapira as Teresa
Arianna Basco

Production
The Fabulous Filipino Brothers was produced under the Philippine production outfit Cignal Entertainment and Los Angeles-based production and management firm TheMachine. The film serves as the directorial debut of Filipino American Hollywood actor Dante Basco known for his role as Rufio in the 1991 film Hook and his voiced role as Zuko in the animated television series Avatar: The Last Airbender. The story of the film, revolving around a Filipino American family, was written by Dante himself along with his brother Darion and sister Arianna.

The Basco siblings' own experience with their family and the wider Filipino American community in their hometown influenced the conception of the film. Director Basco made his own brothers along with himself as the starring actors for the film naming the characters after their father and uncles. The director's sister Arianna and parents were also part of the cast. The film was set in Pittsburg, California the hometown of the Bascos. Principal photography took 16 days in both the United States and Manila in the Philippines, prior to the COVID-19 pandemic.

Release
The Fabulous Filipino Brothers premiered in the United States on March 16, 2021 at the South by Southwest (SXSW) Film Festival in Texas.

The film was later made available in a pay per view basis from October 18 to November 15, 2021 on Cignal and KTX.ph. It was also released worldwide except in Europe and North America in Netflix on November 16, 2021.

References

External links

2021 films
Philippine drama films
Philippine comedy films
2021 independent films
Films about immigration to the United States
Films set in California
Films shot in California
Films set in Metro Manila
Films about brothers
Films about Filipino families
Films about Filipino Americans
Comedy-drama films about Asian Americans